Savannah MOON (known as Savannah MOON Productions) is a creative Film, television, Animation and Web production company in Kampala, Uganda. Its major productions include The Life (2012) and Beneath The Lies - The Series (2014).

Vision
To develop media content development in Uganda and the East African region using the wealth of established and unknown talent within the East African Region and using production crews of both Local and International individuals who collectively have vast knowledge in Film, television, Web, Photography, Music and the Arts, in general. Savannah MOON is based in Kampala, Uganda.

Goals
 Create, Develop, Market and Distribute professional and high-calibre content for the entertainment industry in Uganda, East Africa and worldwide by drawing on the strengths of a diverse team of talented and skilled and crew; and
Generate exposure and build capacity of the Ugandan and East African Entertainment industry. The projects undertaken will provide a new and ground-breaking professional film making experience for Africans on the Continent, the Diaspora and beyond.

Services
In addition to creating and developing content in-house, Savannah MOON also collaborates with other Production houses, Organisations and individuals on projects that are complementary and / or of higher budgets.
Savannah MOON provides services through the film development cycle from Pre-Production to Post-Production. In addition, Savannah MOON also undertakes Film Distribution & Marketing and Talent Development & Management through, ACTA.Talent, its affiliate.

Productions
Savannah MOON has created and produced a full-length feature film THE LIFE, 2010 which was shown on M-NET, a TV Series Beneath the Lies, which is currently being shown on Urban TV and digitally distributed by MTN Uganda and a TV Program, How We See It. Savannah MOON has also co-produced a short film called The Last Breath  with Kampala Film School. Savannah MOON is currently developing several concepts and content including Taking Time, an upcoming TV Series. Savannah MOON is also involved in an initiative, You Are Limitless (YAL), which aims to motivate, guide and encourage Africans, especially the youth to achieve their full potential.

Filmography

Film

Television

Music Videos

See also
The Life
Beneath The Lies - The Series

References

External links
Facebook Page

Film production companies of Uganda
Television production companies of Uganda